John Charles Goudie (born October 14, 1968 in Coral Gables, Florida, United States) is a Cuban-American singer, songwriter, multi-instrumental musician, record producer, actor, and podcaster based in Austin, Texas. Over his five-decade career, he has received acclaim for his unique vocals and a musical style rooted in classic rock. Goudie has been the recipient of four Austin Music Awards and has fronted several bands including Goudie, Mr. Rocket Baby, Lovetree, Panjandrum, Liars & Saints, and the Little Champions. He has also been a sideman in several other bands, notably Endochine, the Lossy Coils, and Skyrocket.

Early life and music career
Raised in the Miami area, Goudie comes from a family of Cuban medical doctors. In 1982, Johnny saw Cheap Trick in concert, and this experience inspired him to become a musician.  Later that year, Goudie started his first band, which he called ZEPHYR. At age 16, Johnny became the guitarist of the band Cry Wolf, the side project of Carole King's guitarist Mark Hallman. On October 13, 1985, when Johnny was 16, his mother was beaten over the head in her apartment. She died 18 days later. The crime went unsolved for 23 years until a tip led police to arrest his mother's ex-boyfriend.  On April 15, 2011 the man was convicted of the murder. Goudie channeled his grief into writing 150 songs in the months following his mother's death.

In 1988 while living outside Houston, Johnny started a funk–soul band called Panjadrum. After Panjadrum broke up in 1990, Goudie formed another band called Lovetree as well as pursued a side career as a solo artist. In 1992 Lovetree recorded an EP entitled Sorry About the Drum Machine. Lovetree's sound was influenced by rock, funk and Latin music.

By 1993 Goudie had left Lovetree and moved to Austin, Texas where he fronted the rock band Mr. Rocket Baby, which included former members of Panjandrum and Lovetree. Heavily influenced by the power pop bands Jellyfish and the Zombies, Mr. Rocket Baby's philosophy was to play 70s-influenced music while dressing and acting like they were from the 1970s. Their first shows were opening for Davíd Garza and Bob Schneider before crowds of hundreds, and they became an instant hit in Austin, inked a management deal within a week, sold their cars and bought a touring van and hit the road.  The band landed a weekly residency at Austin club The Steamboat. In 1993 Mr. Rocket Baby was voted best pop band in the Austin Chronicle's readers poll, and they came in third place in voting for best new band overall. Mr. Rocket Baby released one album, Make Believe, which was produced by Mark Hallman.  Mr. Rocket Baby reunited for one concert in 2015.

On April 10, 1994 Johnny married Traci Campbell in Austin. The couple were married for 10 years. Their divorce was the subject of many songs on Goudie's 2005 album Boy in a Box.

After the breakup of Mr. Rocketbaby, Johnny toured with bassist Einar Pedersen and drummer Kyle Schneider, and the trio self-released an album called Fantastic. In 1996-1997 Johnny played guitar for the band Sunshine and played drums on the album 4-Track Mind with the band Jez Spencer, an early incarnation of Spencer Gibb's band which would become 54 Seconds. He also co-wrote the song "Stuck in a Hole" on Darin Murphy's 1998 album Solitarium as well as co-wrote the song "Sun Earth Moon," which appeared on the Borrowers' second album Overcoming Gravity and was also featured in a commercial for the Cleveland Planetarium.

Goudie 1997–2002

In Spring 1998 Johnny's new band, simply named Goudie, played the South by Southwest festival in Austin. Goudie was the second band signed to the record label The Music Company, a subsidiary of Elektra Records, and a vanity label formed by Metallica drummer Lars Ulrich.

In July 2000 Goudie released its first album Peep Show. In June 2001 the band left Elektra and joined friends at independent Austin label India Records, which released the band's second album ...Effects of Madness in March 2002. However, later that year, the band split up.

Post-Goudie career
Following the breakup of his band, Johnny returned to writing and recording songs in his home studio. He independently released an album of self-recorded demos entitled 18 Unreleased Home Demos 1996-2001 as well as a Christmas album Johnny Says Ho, which was released only to his fan club. These releases led to a series of other demo collections entitled Return of the Handlebar, I Think I'm a Genius, Electric Boogalo, Helloprah! and The Loyalist; the latter consisted entirely of covers. He appeared on Eliza Gilkyson's 2002 album Lost and Found, Colin Gilmore's album The Day the World Stopped and Spun the Other Way, and Jeff Klein's 2003 album Everybody Loves a Winner. He continued to write his own material and in Summer 2003 he released a solo album entitled I Love Elke on Strangelove Records, a label dedicated to artists making records on their own terms. Johnny also co-wrote the song "Intertwined" which appeared on Canvas's 2004 album Four Days Awake. He was voted best keyboard player in the 2004 Austin Chronicle music awards for his work with the band Endochine on their nationwide tour supporting their album Day Two.

Goudie also produced albums for scores of local bands and musicians. In 2004 Johnny produced Canvas's third album Painting the Roses. On the subsequent tour for Painting the Roses, Johnny played as opening act with Canvas as his backing band, and then played keyboard with Canvas during their headlining set. Goudie also played several acoustic shows with Canvas frontman Joseph King and was briefly a member of King's post-Canvas band which became Deadbeat Darling. In 2007, along with Stephen Doster, Goudie co-produced Stefanie Fix's album Crooked Smile.

Later in 2004 Johnny played on Pale's album Here in addition to completing his second solo album Boy in a Box, which was the debut release of F+M Records. The tracks "Back of a Magazine" and "Everyone Remembers (When You're Cool)" from Boy in a Box were included on the soundtrack of the 2006 short film Surf Gang. 2006 also saw the release of Johnny's acoustic album All You Can't Undo, which he supported with a nationwide acoustic tour with Taylor Davis. While on tour, Goudie and Davis met singer/songwriter Shwa Losben, and the three recorded an album titled Chop Chop.  In 2007 Johnny joined long-time friend Ian Moore's band, the Lossy Coils, on a nationwide tour in support of their album To Be Loved.

In 2003 Johnny joined the cover band K-Tel Hit Machine, which was later renamed "SKYROCKET!". The band features several of the best players from the Austin music scene and has won two Austin Music Awards.

In addition to being a member of the Lossy Coils and SKYROCKET!, Johnny still plays live shows as a solo artist, and has assembled a band titled Johnny Goudie and the Little Champions, which includes Brad Byrum (bass) and Scott Thomas (drums) of Canvas and Ryan Holley (lead guitar) and Sweeney Tidball (keyboard). The band released its debut album El Payaso on February 3, 2009. Johnny co-wrote the song "Broken" with Rachel Loy and Sara Hickman for the  2010 album Absence Of Blame. Johnny formed the band Liars & Saints along with fellow singer-songwriters Jeremy Nail and Kacy Crowley, and released an album in 2011. Johnny has also played in Kathy Valentine's bands the Impossible and the Bluebonnets, and in 2014 he recorded an EP with Valentine on which he co-wrote two of the songs.  His backing band has been a revolving cast of musicians, often being an entirely female lineup including at various times Kathy Valentine, Suzanna Choffel and Dominique Davalos.  The band's name has evolved from "Johnny Goudie and the Lady Champions" to "Johnny in the Ladies Room" to "Lady Band Johnson". 

In 2014 he played guitar, piano, organ slide and sang harmonies on Kimmie Rhodes' album Cowgirl Boudoir.  The album also includes a cover version of the song "I Am Falling", which Goudie wrote (the original version appeared on his 2003 album I Love Elke). In late 2014 Goudie also provided backing vocals on Paco Estrada's album Bedtime Stories.

In January 2018 Johnny entered the studio to record a solo EP with producer "Scrappy" Jud Newcomb. The EP, entitled "Leper Hands", was released September 13, 2018.

In 2021 Jonny began releasing new singles each month. So far he has released the songs "Marigolds", "All New Flavor", and a new version of "Sun Earth Moon".

Podcast
In 2011 Johnny started broadcasting a podcast entitled "How Did I Get Here?" in which he interviews fellow musicians and people in the entertainment industry. As of October 2020, he has recorded over 1,200 episodes. The podcast was the 2019 Austin Chronicle's critics pick in the category of politics and media.

Selected discography

Selected filmography

Television roles

References

External links
how did i get here? podcast
SKYROCKET! Official website
Johnny Goudie on Myspace
 Interviews
 Doin' It for the Ladies
 Interview with Goudie
 10 Questions for Johnny Goudie

American people of Cuban descent
Musicians from Austin, Texas
Living people
Writers from Austin, Texas
Songwriters from Florida
American male singers
American rock singers
American rock guitarists
American male guitarists
Musicians from Miami
1968 births
Songwriters from Texas
Guitarists from Florida
Guitarists from Texas
20th-century American guitarists
20th-century American male musicians
American male songwriters